There is unconfirmed evidence that a No. 1439 (Strategic Reconnaissance) Flight RAF was formed during the Western Desert Campaign ca. June 1942, flying Bristol Blenheim aircraft.

The flight was reformed as No. 1439 (Communication Support) Flight at RAF Hemswell on 8 May 1957 to support the Nuclear Weapons Task Force during the Operation Grapple nuclear weapon tests on or near Christmas Island (Kiritimati) in a remote Pacific region. Flying continued for six months until the Flight was dis-banded on 20 November 1957.

Aircraft operated

Flight bases

References
Notes

Bibliography

 Lake, Alan. Flying Units of the RAF. Shrewsbury, Shropshire, UK: Airlife Publishing, 1999. .
 Sturtivant, Ray, ISO and John Hamlin. RAF Flying Training And Support Units since 1912. Tonbridge, Kent, UK: Air-Britain (Historians) Ltd., 2007. .

Military units and formations established in 1957
1439 Flight
Military units and formations disestablished in 1957